Vingtaine de Samarès is one of the three vingtaines of the Parish of St. Clement in Jersey, Channel Islands.

It takes its name from the salt marsh that used to occupy much of the area of this low-lying coastal vingtaine.

Samarès used to be served by the Jersey Eastern Railway.  The local train station was opened on 7 August 1873, and closed on 21 June 1929. The station building still exists, and is now a private house.

Places in the vingtaine
Samarès Manor
Samarès primary school
Mont Ubé and its dolmen
La Grève d'Azette, a sandy beach which spans from Le Dicq to La Motte
FB Playing Fields, sports pitches and facilities
Rocque Berg, the Witches' Rock connected with beliefs of witchcraft
La Motte, a tidal island and prehistoric site

See also
Vingtaine du Rocquier
Grande Vingtaine

Footnotes and references

Samares
Saint Clement, Jersey